Events in the year 2019 in South Africa.

Incumbents
 President: Cyril Ramaphosa (ANC) 
 Deputy President: David Mabuza (ANC)
 Chief Justice: Mogoeng Mogoeng
 Deputy Chief Justice: Raymond Zondo
 President of the Supreme Court of Appeal: Mandisa Maya
 Deputy President of the Supreme Court of Appeal: Jeremiah Shongwe (Acting)
 Chairperson of the Electoral Court of South Africa: Khayelihle Kenneth Mthiyane
 Speaker of the National Assembly: Baleka Mbete (ANC)
Deputy Speaker of the National Assembly: Lechesa Tsenoli (ANC)
Leader of the Opposition in the National Assembly: Mmusi Maimane (DA)
Leader of Government Business: David Mabuza (ANC)
Government Chief Whip (of the National Assembly): Jackson Mthembu (ANC)
Opposition Chief Whip (of the National Assembly): John Steenhuisen (DA)
 Chairperson of the National Council of Provinces: Thandi Modise (ANC)
Deputy Chairperson of the National Council of Provinces: Raseriti Tau (ANC)
Leader of the Opposition of the National Council of Provinces: Cathlene Labuschagne (DA)
House Chairperson (of the National Council of Provinces): Archibold Nyambi (ANC) and Masefako Dikgale (ANC)
Chief Whip (of the National Council of Provinces): Seiso Mohai (ANC)

Cabinet 
The Cabinet, together with the President and the Deputy President, forms the Executive.

National Assembly and National Council of Provinces

Provincial Premiers 
 Eastern Cape Province: Phumulo Masualle (ANC) 
 Free State Province: Sisi Ntombela (ANC) 
 Gauteng Province: David Makhura (ANC) 
 KwaZulu-Natal Province: Willies Mchunu (ANC) 
 Limpopo Province: Stanley Mathabatha (ANC) 
 Mpumalanga Province: Refilwe Mtsweni-Tsipane (ANC) 
 North West Province: Job Mokgoro (ANC) 
 Northern Cape Province: Sylvia Lucas (ANC) 
 Western Cape Province: Helen Zille (DA)

Predicted and scheduled events 
Events that are scheduled to occur in 2019 in South Africa.

February

March 

 3 March – The first One-Day International (ODI) match in the series between South Africa and Sri Lanka are set to take place in Johannesburg (Wanderers Cricket Stadium.
6 March – The second ODI match in the series between South Africa and Sri Lanka are set to take place in Centurion (SuperSport Park).
10 March – The third ODI match in the series between South Africa and Sri Lanka are set to take place in Durban (Kingsmead Cricket Ground).

April

May 

 8 May – General elections will be held, to elect a new National Assembly and new provincial legislations in each province.

Events
The following lists events that happened during 2019 in South Africa.

January

 3 January – The second Test match in the series between South Africa and Pakistan takes place in Cape Town (Newlands Cricket Ground). South Africa win the match within four days, by 9 wickets. South Africa takes a 2–0 lead in the 3-match Test series. (Test no.2340)
 11 January – The third Test match in the series between South Africa and Pakistan takes place in Johannesburg (Wanderers Cricket Stadium). South Africa win the match within four days, by 107 runs. South Africa win the 3-match Test series, 3–0. (Test no.2341)
15 January – The commission of inquiry into allegations of State capture in South Africa (which is led by Deputy Chief Justice Raymond Zondo) resumes after the December break.
 19 January – The first One-Day International (ODI) match in the series between South Africa and Pakistan takes place in Port Elizabeth (St George's Park Cricket Ground). Pakistan win the match with 5 wickets, with 5 balls remaining. Pakistan takes a 0–1 lead in the 5-match ODI series. (ODI no. 4080)
 22 January – The second ODI match in the series between South Africa and Pakistan takes place in Durban (Kingsmead Cricket Ground). South Africa win the match by 5 wickets, with 48 balls remaining. South Africa levels the 5-match ODI series, 1–1. (ODI no. 4081)
25 January – The third ODI match in the series between South Africa and Pakistan takes place in Centurion (SuperSport Park). South Africa win the match by 13 runs (following the Duckworth-Lewis calculation). South Africa takes the lead in the series, 2–1. (ODI no. 4084)
27 January – The fourth ODI match in the series between South Africa and Pakistan takes place in Johannesburg (Wanderers Cricket Stadium). Pakistan win the match by 8 wickets, with 111 balls remaining. Pakistan levels the series, 2–2. (ODI no. 4087)
30 January – The fifth ODI match in the series between South Africa and Pakistan takes place in Cape Town (Newlands Cricket Ground). South Africa win the match by 7 wickets, with 60 balls remaining. South Africa win the 5-match ODI series, 3–2 (ODI no. 4090)

February

1 February – The first Twenty20 International (T20I) match in the series between South Africa and Pakistan takes place in Cape Town (Newlands Cricket Ground). South Africa win the match by 6 runs. South Africa takes a 0–1 lead in the 3-match T20I series. (T20I no. 732)
3 February – The second T20I match in the series between South Africa and Pakistan takes place in Johannesburg (Wanderers Cricket Stadium). South Africa win the match by 7 runs. South Africa takes a lead in the series, 2–0. (T20I no. 734)
6 February – The third T20I match in the series between South Africa and Pakistan takes place in Centurion (SuperSport Park). Pakistan win the match by 27 runs. South Africa win the 3-match T20I series, 2–1 (T20I no. 736)
7 February – President Cyril Ramaphosa delivers his second State of the Nation Address (SoNA) to a Joint Sitting of the National Assembly and the National Council of Provinces on at 7 pm (19:00). This is also the final SoNA of the current administration, before the National Elections
13 February – The first Test match in the series between South Africa and Sri Lanka takes place in Durban (Kingsmead Cricket Ground). Sri Lanka win the match within four days, by 1 wicket. Sri Lanka takes a 1–0 lead in the 2-match Test series. (Test no. 2347)
21 February – The second Test match in the series between South Africa and Sri Lanka takes place in Port Elizabeth (St George's Park Cricket Ground). Sri Lanka win the match within three days, by 8 wickets. Sri Lanka win the 2-match Test series, 2–0. (Test no. 2358)

September

1 September – About five people were killed in the xenophobic riots against foreigners.
2 – 6 – Large protests against gender-based violence and femicide occur after the news of student Uyinene Mrwetyana's death.

October

18 – 23 – 2019 African Netball Championships was held in South Africa and hosts South Africa were adjudged the winners of the tournament.

November

2 November – South Africa were crowned world champions defeating England 32–12 in the final of the 2019 Rugby World Cup.

December

8 December - Miss South Africa 2019, Zozibini Tunzi is crowned Miss Universe 2019 at Tyler Perry Studios in Atlanta, Georgia, United States. It was South Africa's third win after the recent victory of Demi-Leigh Nel-Peters in 2017. Tunzi was the first black woman winner since Leila Lopes was crowned in 2011, and South Africa's 1st black winner of an international pageant.

Deaths

 5 January – Dan Tshanda, 54, musician (Splash).
 6 January – Johan Claassen, rugby union player and coach (national team) (b. 1929).
 13 January – Phil Masinga, footballer (b. 1969).
 16 January – Hugh Lewin, anti-apartheid activist and writer (b. 1939).
 20 January – Dumisani Kumalo, politician and diplomat, UN ambassador (b. 1947).
 10 February – Terry Dempsey, songwriter (b. 1941).
 17 February – Kelly Seymour, cricketer (b. 1936).
 18 February – Wim Richter, chemist (b. 1946).
 23 February – Dorothy Masuka, jazz singer (b. 1935).
 24 February – Dame Margaret Scott, ballet dancer (b. 1922).
 19 March – Arthur Bartman, footballer (b. 1972).
 12 June – Thandi Brewer, filmmaker.
 15 July – Marc Batchelor, South African footballer (b. 1970)
 16 July – Johnny Clegg, musician (b. 1953)
 24 August – Uyinene Mrwetyana, student (b. 2000)
 1 November – Thuliswa Nkabinde-Khawe, politician (b. 197)
 14 November – King Zwelonke Sigcawu, South African royal, King of the Xhosa people (since 2006). (b. 1968)
 9 December – Ben Turok, anti-apartheid activist (b. 1927)

References

 
2010s in South Africa
Years of the 21st century in South Africa
South Africa
South Africa